Fredrikstad District Court is a district court located in Fredrikstad, Norway.  It covers the municipalities of Fredrikstad and Hvaler  and is subordinate Borgarting Court of Appeal.

References

External links 
Official site 

Defunct district courts of Norway
Organisations based in Fredrikstad